Yunis Khatayer Abbas is an Iraqi journalist who is most famous for being the subject of the 2007 documentary The Prisoner or: How I Planned to Kill Tony Blair.

In 1998 he was imprisoned and tortured for writings he had made as a journalist under Saddam Hussein.

Five years later in 2003, he was detained by United States troops and later imprisoned at Abu Ghraib prison for nine months.  Although innocent he was suspected of plotting to assassinate then British prime minister Tony Blair along with his two brothers.  During his time at Abu Ghraib he assisted American prison guards in basic translation to helping quell protests and riots; he was later released in 2004.

See also
Human rights in post-Saddam Iraq
Iraq War
Human rights violations in Iraq

External links
Website for The Prisoner
Trailer of "The Prisoner" - YouTube

References

Living people
21st-century Iraqi journalists
Imprisoned journalists
Year of birth missing (living people)
20th-century Iraqi journalists